Makwa may refer to:

Geography
Nigeria
Makwa, Nigeria (also spelled Makwia), a town in Sokoto State

 Saskatchewan, Canada
Makwa, Saskatchewan, a village
Makwa Lake, a lake
Makwa River, a river
Makwa Sahgaiehcan First Nation
Makwa Lake Provincial Park, a park

Science and technology
Makwa (cryptography), a cryptographic algorithm used as a key derivation function